Wild Life is the fifth studio album by Canadian pop/rock band Hedley. It was released via Universal Music Canada on November 11, 2013 in their native Canada, while the album was via Capitol Records in the US on May 20, 2014. The album debuted and peaked at No. 4 on the Canadian Albums Chart. It sold 64,000 copies in Canada in 2013. Wild Life was certified Platinum by Music Canada on March 10, 2014. The album was released in the US on May 19, 2014.

Promotion

Singles
The album's lead single and lead track "Anything" was released on August 27, 2013, and the music video premiered on September 10. The song has peaked at number 5 on the Billboard Canadian Hot 100. The song has sold 90,000 digital copies.

The second track "Crazy for You" was released as a promotional single on October 22, 2013, and as the second official single from Wild Life on January 10, 2014. It was also released to hot adult contemporary radio in the US on March 17, 2014. A music video for the song premiered February 14, 2014. As of June 2014, the song has peaked at No. 7 on the Canadian Hot 100 and within the top 10 on the CHR, Hot AC, and AC radio formats and has sold 166,000 digital copies. The music video stars actress Aurelia Scheppers.

The seventh track "Heaven In Our Headlights" was issued to radio as the third official single from the album on June 17, 2014, while the music video premiered later that week on June 20. It debuted at No. 47 on the Canadian Hot 100 for the chart dated July 3, 2014. The song sold 82,000 digital copies in 2014.

The fifth track "Pocket Full of Dreams" was announced as the fourth single from the album on November 18, 2014. The band uploaded an official lyric video to YouTube on the same day.

Reception

Stephen Thomas Erlewine from AllMusic gave the album a three out of five star rating.

Track listing

Charts

Weekly charts

Year-end charts

Singles

Certifications

Release history

References

2013 albums
Hedley (band) albums
Universal Music Canada albums
Capitol Records albums